The Big V Comedies (also known as “Vitaphone Comedies”) were two-reel (17 to 20 minute long) comedy film shorts produced by Warner Bros. and Vitaphone between 1931 and 1938, contemporary of the more famous Hal Roach, Mack Sennett and Columbia Pictures comedies.

Overview

Most of these Warner short subjects were filmed at the Brooklyn, New York facilities, but a few 1935 titles handled by Ralph Staub were done in Hollywood, including the classic Keystone Hotel.  (This was a similar situation with the contemporary Educational Pictures, which also made its film shorts in both New York and Hollywood during the same period.) Samuel Sax was often producer in charge.

Among the most famous of these were the very last films starring Fatty Arbuckle, along with vintage screen appearances of Shemp Howard of Three Stooges fame and Bob Hope before his big break in features and radio. One mini-series, dubbed “Girlfriends Comedies” featured Thelma White and Fanny Watson. 

The production standards were usually first rate (since the same company made the popular Broadway Brevities and Melody Masters), but the success of an individual film depended on both the talent of the performers and the writers involved. Also many titles were filmed indoors with fewer outdoor action scenes than many California produced comedy shorts. 

The name “Big V” was used rather loosely in the trade periodicals, with later logos “Vitaphone Comedy” and “Vitaphone Gay-ety” (for the more musical product) alternating as substitute names in the later years.   Some titles were given alternative series names by Motion Picture Herald as “Big Star Comedies” or simply “2-reel comedies”. 

The studio stopped making two-reel comedies in 1938, the same year that Hal Roach sold his Our Gang series to MGM and 20th Century Fox stopped distributing the Educational product. Apart from an occasional special, the Looney Tunes and Merrie Melodies supplied much of the comedy before the Warner feature attraction, until the Joe McDoakes series began in the 1940s.

List of titles

Below is a listing arranged by year of release with title listed first, followed by major credits, release date  (and sometimes Film Daily review or copyright date ) and DVD availability (some on sets put out by the Warner Archive Collection).

1931

1932

1933

1934

1935

1936

1937

1938

See also
List of short subjects by Hollywood studio#Warner Bros.

Links
Film Daily links (dates of reviews listed above)
DVD Talk review of Vitaphone Comedy Collection Volume 1
 DVD Talk review of Vitaphone Comedy Collection Volume 2

References
  (lists by Vitaphone numbers with credits)
 Catalog of Copyright Entries: Cumulative Series. Motion Pictures 1912-1939 (51,112 films), published in 1951. L.C. card, 51-60018. (copy) (copyright date and additional information)
BoxOffice back issue scans available (release date information in multiple issue “Shorts Charts” )

Notes

Vitaphone short films
Warner Bros. short films